Moosa Bin Shamsher (born 15 October 1945) is a Bangladeshi businessman and the chairman and chief executive officer of DATCO Group. The main purpose of the group is to export labor from Bangladesh to other countries. His other identity is an international arms dealer.

Business 
Moosa founded DATCO Group, a manpower recruitment firm. Moosa claims to be an international arms dealer who made billions of dollars trading arms in the 1970s and 1980s. He claims that he accumulated $10 billion from trading in tanks, fighter jets, ICBMs, and power brokerages. He also claimed that he has around $7 billion in Swiss bank accounts that have been frozen due to irregular transactions. Moosa stated in 2019 that he wanted to bring over €20 billion to Bangladesh, including money that he earned doing business with Adnan Khashoggi. Moosa claims to have made a large amount of his fortune from the Iran–Iraq War. However, a government probe against him found that all his claims were baseless as Moosa couldn't provide any proof about his business dealings when questioned by the Bangladeshi ACC. An investigation also found that he had no Swiss bank account and barely had any assets in his name.

Partnership with Adnan Khashoggi 
In an article written by Moosa, he claims that he was a close friend and business partner of the Saudi international arms-dealer Adnan Khashoggi. According to him they regularly worked together in brokering deals and traded arms mainly in Africa. Moosa stated in 2019 that when Adnan Khashoggi died in 2017, he left Moosa billions of dollars in his will. A Zambian news outlet reported in 2018 that before the demise of Adnan Khashoggi, Khashoggi spoke to Moosa on the phone and let Moosa in on many game-changing military secrets, known only to a few elite individuals in the world. The report also stated that Moosa claimed Khashoggi instructed him to do everything possible to bring peace between North Korea and the United States.

Acquisition of Rupali Bank 
In August 2006, Moosa backed a deal made by his friend and business partner Saudi prince Bandar bin Muhammad Al-Saud to acquire a majority 67% stake in the Bangladeshi state owned bank Rupali Bank for US$330 million. Prince Bandar Al-Saud also pledged to invest US$6 billion to the emerging markets of the Bangladeshi economy.

Media

DATCO group 
Formed in 1975, Shamsher's business DATCO is now primarily engaged in the export of labour in the form of migrant rural farmers from Bangladesh to the booming construction industries in the Middle East.

Offering donation
During the UK 1997 general election it was reported that Moosa offered the Labour Party and Tony Blair £5 million campaign donation. Although the party declined the donation the offer itself received a lot of media attention.

Brokering peace between Trump and Kim Jong-un 
Moosa claims that the historic 2018 North Korea–United States Singapore Summit, where Donald Trump had a meeting with Kim Jong-un, was brokered by him. A Zambian news outlet reported that Moosa enlisted the help of Paul Manafort Jr. and sent a hand-written letter to Donald Trump advising him to back-off from his standoff with North Korea. He claims that he wrote similar letters to Speaker of the House Paul Ryan, Prime Minister of Shinzo Abe of Japan, and Crown Prince Mohammad bin Salman of Saudi Arabia. In the news report, Moosa stated that he helped bring peace between the United States and North Korea because prior to Adnan Khashoggi's death, Moosa spoke to him on the phone and he told Moosa about North Korea's nuclear missiles and extreme military power. Moosa states that a confrontation with North Korea would result in a Third World War, which had to be prevented at any cost.

Personal life
Moosa is married to Kaniz Fatema and has 2 sons and 1 daughter with her. His son Zubi Moosa is a lawyer. His son Bobby Hajjaj is a politician. His daughter is married to Sheikh Fazle Fahim, the son of Sheikh Fazlul Karim Selim. Moosa is fluent in Bengali, English, and Urdu.

Controversy

Travel restrictions 

According to an Indian online news outlet, United News of India, Moosa was warned not to travel to Middle Eastern countries because of the threat posed to him by Pakistan's ISI and Israel's Mossad. It was stated in the article that Moosa's relationship with Brunei was so good that it helped strain Brunei–Pakistan relations, much to the dismay of the ISI. Moosa believes that the 2004 Dhaka grenade attack on Sheikh Hasina was perpetrated by Pakistan, which is why he took it on himself to get revenge on Pakistan. Moosa also claims that the Mossad were after him because Israel wanted a share in the money that Moosa received after the death of Adnan Khashoggi, because Israel claims to have helped the duo in their arms dealings. Due to these alleged threats, Moosa filed many cases in different Bangladeshi police stations. Moosa claims that the Pakistani intelligence outfit repeatedly tried to attack members of Sheikh Mujib's family, but he always prevented any danger as he was always steps ahead of them. According to Moosa himself, he made an oath to Sheikh Mujib to always protect Sheikh Hasina.

Alleged collaboration with the Pakistan Army 
In his native Faridpur, Moosa is referred to as "Nula Razakar" (razakar refers to Bengalis who collaborated with the Pakistan Army) for his alleged collaboration with the Pakistan Army in war crimes during the Bangladesh Liberation War.

Tax evasion 
In March 2017, Bangladesh Customs seized a Range Rover which was smuggled in by Moosa. Moosa evaded a tax of Tk. 2.17 crore by registering the car under falsified import documents. The car was registered in Bhola under one of Moosa's associates' names after it reportedly paid a 130% import tax. However, after law enforcers searched the Chittagong Custom House for the car's bill of entry, they found out that the papers were falsified and no tax was paid. After seizing the car they realized that it was repainted from white to black, to confuse law enforcers. Moosa was charged with money laundering and evasion of duty by the Chittagong Custom House.

False statements regarding wealth 
In June 2020, the ACC claimed that Moosa had misled the agency by lying about all his wealth and business dealings. They claimed that he presented himself as a prince, well-connected arms dealer, power broker, and businessman, whereas in reality, he couldn't provide the agency correct information regarding his wealth when he was being investigated. Moosa claims to have roughly US$12 Billion and US$10 million worth (in 2020 dollars) of diamonds frozen in his Swiss bank accounts. He also claimed that he owned around 1,200 bighas (roughly 400 acres) of land in Savar and Gazipur. However, after the ACC investigated him, they found that his claims of having Swiss bank accounts and owning huge swaths of land were all false. When questioned about his arms-dealing and Swiss bank accounts, he failed to submit any papers records to prove his claims. The government probe found that he had only 5 cars and a house in the affluent Gulshan area of Dhaka (which has been handed over to a development company), all of which were owned by his wife. The only asset owned by him was an ancestral piece of land in his native Faridpur, which his siblings also had shared. The government probe also found out that his tall claims of political connections, private intelligence, and protecting Sheikh Hasina were all baseless self-made claims.

Fraudulent practices
In 2005, the CID filed a show-cause notice against Moosa on charges of defrauding 3 workers of Tk. 18.8 million. The CID claimed that Moosa promised 300 people overseas jobs but ended up deceiving them. The CID also accused him of abducting and vanishing one of his employees named Nazrul Islam. Other allegations against him included forgery; providing fake passports and visas; flattery, kidnapping, and violation of women. Cases and allegations have been filed against him since 1990. The journalists who leaked information regarding Moosa and his malpractices were harassed by miscreants hired by Moosa, and one of the journalists lost a limb.

References

Further reading
 
 

Bangladeshi businesspeople
1945 births
Living people
Bangladeshi Muslims
20th-century Bengalis
21st-century Bengalis
People from Faridpur District